Kroton is a fictional character who appeared in the Doctor Who Magazine￼￼ comic strip based on the long-running British science fiction television series Doctor Who. He was a companion of the Eighth Doctor. He should not be confused with the Krotons, the villains of the 1968 serial The Krotons.

Kroton is a Cyberman, a member of the cybernetically augmented race that is one of the most persistent enemies of the Doctor. However, unlike other Cybermen, Kroton still retains human feelings despite undergoing cyber-conversion. Kroton first appeared in the comic strip Throwback — The Soul of a Cyberman, published in Doctor Who Weekly #5-#7 (as it then was), written by Steve Moore and drawn by Steve Dillon.

Character history

In Throwback, the Cybermen invade the planet Mondaran, but continue to encounter heavy human resistance. Among the reinforcements from the Cyberman colony world Telos is Junior Cyberleader Kroton, who discovers that he sympathizes with the rebels. He helps the surviving rebels escape the planet, even to the point of killing his fellow Cybermen to defend the rebels. However, uncertain about the meaning of his own existence, he does not stay with the humans, but pilots his ship alone into space, planning to let his power supplies run down.

However, Kroton survives, encountering a pleasure cruiser that is caught in a time warp (Ship of Fools, DWW #23-#24). Despite the passengers' lack of concern, he manages to access the robot pilot of the ship and free it from its endless looping through time. Unfortunately the ship has been trapped in the time warp for 628 years, and when time catches up with the passengers, they all instantly age and die, leaving Kroton alone with only the robot pilot for company.

Kroton did not reappear until nearly 19 years later, in Unnatural Born Killers (DWM #277), where he fights off a Sontaran raid on a primitive human village; in the time since his last appearances, he has become more proactive and physical as well as speaking more colloquially. The story set up his appearance less than a year later in The Company of Thieves (DWM #284-#286) where he meets the Eighth Doctor and his companion Izzy on a freighter that has been captured by space pirates. After initially mistaking him for a typical Cyberman and trying to kill him, the Doctor realizes that Kroton is different. Together, they deal with the pirates who are attempting to capture an intelligent super-weapon. At the conclusion of that story, the Doctor welcomes Kroton aboard the TARDIS.

The TARDIS next takes the Doctor, Izzy and Kroton to the museum planet Paradost, where memories can be accessed and enhanced by means of mnemonic crystals. However, Kroton refuses to use them, believing that to remember his life before cyber-conversion would be too painful. The travelers' visit coincides with the launch of a jihad by the planet Dhakan's Church of the Glorious Dead. The wholesale slaughter turns out to be the work of the renegade Time Lord known as the Master, who had survived his last encounter with the Doctor and had been contacted by Esterath, a cosmic being that controls the Glory, the focal point of the Omniversal spectrum which underlies all existence. Esterath is dying and needs to pass control of the Glory over to the worthier of two adversaries, and tells the Master that he and the Doctor had been chosen.

While the Doctor and the Master grapple in the Omniversal spectrum, Izzy and Kroton deal with the person who led the massacre on Paradost: Cardinal Morningstar, actually an immortal samurai named Sato who had found eternal life without meaning much as Kroton had. The Master had found Sato and used him to alter Earth's history and make it Dhakan. Sato and Kroton fight, but Kroton is unable to defeat Sato physically.

In the spectrum, the Doctor loses his battle with the Master. As Sato is also about to prove victorious over Kroton, Izzy uses a mnemonic crystal to make Sato realize the full import of his part in the slaughter on Paradost, and Sato falls unconscious. Izzy also makes Kroton use the crystal, causing him to remember his pre-conversion life and finally come to terms with it. As the Glory arrives to acknowledge its new controller, the Master steps forward to claim it, but is rejected.

It is then revealed that the true adversaries chosen by the Glory were not the Master and the Doctor, but Sato and Kroton. Both of them were made immortal by technology, but Kroton won by choosing hope over despair. Kroton takes his place as the new controller of the Glory, restoring the proper timeline, banishing the Master to parts unknown and granting Sato his wish of an honorable death. The Doctor and Izzy continue their journeys without him (The Glorious Dead, DWM #287-#296).

Other appearances
In the Eighth Doctor novel The Scarlet Empress, Time Lady Iris Wildthyme mentions that at some point during her travels, she encountered and befriended Kroton. The Doctor, however, gives no response, which may imply that the events of the novel take place before his own meeting with Kroton. However, Throwback is "narrated" by the Fourth Doctor, who describes it as a recounting of an incident in the Time Lord archives.

External links

Comics characters introduced in 1979
Doctor Who comic strip characters
Doctor Who spin-off companions
Male characters in comics